Brian Tetsuro Ivie (born September 27, 1990 in Glendale, California) is a Japanese-American filmmaker, film producer and documentarian. He is the youngest active producer for Stephen Curry’s Unanimous Media empire. Ivie is most well known for his documentary film, Emanuel, which tells the story of the 2015 Charleston church shooting, which took the lives of nine innocent African Americans. The film was produced by Viola Davis and Mariska Hargitay, & by NBA star Stephen Curry.

Career 
Ivie studied film and television at the University of Southern California, where he also began producing his first documentary feature, The Drop Box, the story of a South Korean pastor, who rescues children through a small “hatch” built into the wall of his home. The film was later released by Fathom Events, grossing over $3 million in just four nights.

After graduation, Ivie signed to Creative Artists Agency, and would go on to produce and direct Emanuel, the story of forgiveness following a mass shooting, along with executive producers Viola Davis, Mariska Hargitay, and Stephen Curry, & release it to critical acclaim on the fourth anniversary of the shooting. The film made its television debut on Starz. Ivie is a frequent collaborator of actor and producer John Shepherd of the Friday the 13th horror franchise.

In 2019, it was announced that Ivie would write the Kirk Franklin biopic for producer Devon Franklin and Sony Pictures.

In 2021, Ivie joined Stephen Curry’s Unanimous Media as an in-house creative producer, overseeing film, television, and documentary projects for worldwide distribution. In October 2021, Ivie and Unanimous released the documentary short film, Cancer Alley. The film, which tells the story of the most contaminated place in America and those who live there, was awarded a Vimeo Staff Pick, along with a Nowness Pick for the month of October. A feature film is underway with Stephen Curry executive producing.

In March 2022, it was announced that Ivie would co-executive produce, The Queen of Basketball, alongside Curry and fellow USC alum Ben Proudfoot. The sports-themed film, also executive produced by Shaquille O'Neal, was awarded the 2022 Academy Award for Best Documentary Short Film.

Personal life 
Ivie, who is half-Japanese, was raised in Orange County, California and began making movies at a young age. His grandmother, Marian Tanabe, formerly Umeda, was interned at the Rohwer War Relocation Center during World War II. Ivie is a devout non-denominational Christian and his work often reflects his beliefs.

References 

1990 births
Living people
American documentary film directors
Film directors from California
University of Southern California alumni
People from Glendale, California